The Chinese Music Awards is a music awards founded in 2008 to recognize outstanding achievement in the Chinese music industry.

Categories 
 Top 10 Mandarin Albums
 Top 10 Cantonese Albums
 Top 10 Mandarin Songs
 Top 10 Cantonese Songs
 Best Mandarin Male Singer
 Best Mandarin Female Singer
 Best Cantonese Male Singer
 Best Cantonese Female Singer
 Best Mandarin New Male Artist
 Best Mandarin New Female Artist
 Best Cantonese New Male Artist
 Best Cantonese New Female Artist
 Best Band
 Best Group
 Best New Band
 Best New Group
 Best Ballad Artist
 Best World/Folk Music Artist
 Best Rock Artist
 Best Electronic Artist
 Best Jazz/Blues Artist
 Best Dance Artist
 Best Hip-Hop Artist
 Best Singer-Songwriter
 Best Original Soundtrack
 Best Compilation Album
 Best Mandarin Album
 Best Cantonese Album
 Best Hokkien Album
 Best Hakka Album
 Best Mandarin Song
 Best Cantonese Song
 best Hokkien Song
 Best Hakka Song
 Artist of the Year
 Jury Award

References

External links
Official website			
	

2008 establishments in China
Awards established in 2008
Chinese music awards
Recurring events established in 2008